{{Infobox settlement

| name                     = Ahmedabad District
| native_name              = ahmedabad 
| native_name_lang         = 
| settlement_type          = District of Gujarat
| image_skyline            =  
| image_alt                = 
| image_caption            = Clockwise from top-left: Sabarmati Ashram, Hutheesing Jain Temple, Jami Masjid, Ahmedabad, birds in Nal Sarovar, Sardar Patel Stadium
| image_flag               = 
| flag_alt                 = 
| image_seal               = 
| seal_alt                 = 
| image_shield             = 
| shield_alt               = 
| nickname                 = Ahm
| motto                    = 
| image_map                = Ahmedabad in Gujarat (India).svg
| map_alt                  = 
| map_caption              = Ahmedabad location in Gujarat
| pushpin_map              = 
| pushpin_label_position   = 
| pushpin_map_alt          = 
| pushpin_map_caption      = 
| coordinates              = 
| coor_pinpoint            = 
| coordinates_footnotes    = 
| subdivision_type         = Country
| subdivision_name         = 
| subdivision_type2        = 
| subdivision_type1        = State
| subdivision_name1        = Gujarat
| subdivision_name2        = 
| established_title        = 
| established_date         = 
| founder                  = 
| named_for                = Karnavati
| seat_type                = Headquarters
| seat                     = Ahmedabad
| government_footnotes     = 
| leader_party             = Bjp(bharatiya janata party)
| leader_title             = District Collector
| leader_name              = Sandip J. Sagale IAS
| leader_title1            = 
| leader_name1             = 
| total_type               = 
| unit_pref                = 
| area_footnotes           = 
| area_magnitude           = 
| area_total_km2           = 8087
| area_total_sq_mi         = 
| area_land_km2            = 
| area_land_sq_mi          = 
| area_water_km2           = 
| area_water_sq_mi         = 
| area_water_percent       = 
| area_note                = 
| elevation_footnotes      = 
| elevation_m              = 
| elevation_ft             = 
| population_total         = 7,045,313
| population_as_of         = 2011
| population_footnotes     = 
| population_density_km2   = auto
| population_est           = 
| population_rank          = 1 of 33 in Gujarat
| pop_est_as_of            = 
| population_note          = 
| timezone1                = I
| utc_offset1              = 
| timezone1_DST            = IST (UTC+05:30)
| utc_offset1_DST          = 
| postal_code_type         = 
| postal_code              = 
| area_code                = 
| area_code_type           = 
| blank_info_sec2          =  0.783<ref name="snhdi-gdl">
Ahmedabad district comprises the city of Ahmedabad, in the central part of the state of Gujarat in western India. It is the seventh most populous district in India (out of 739).

Etymology 

The area around Ahmedabad has been inhabited since the 11th century, when it was known as Ashaval. At that time, Karna, the Chaulukya (Solanki) ruler of Anhilwara (modern Patan), waged a successful war against the Bhil king of Ashaval, and established a city called Karnavati on the banks of the Sabarmati.

In 1411, this area came under the control of Muzaffar Shah I's grandson, Sultan Ahmed Shah, who selected the forested area along the banks of the Sabarmati river for a new capital city. He laid the foundation of a new walled city near Karnavati and named it Ahmedabad after himself. According to other versions, he named the city after four Muslim saints in the area who all had the name Ahmedabad.

Data

Climate

Talukas

Following are the talukas of Ahmedabad district:

Talukas in Ahmedabad City - East
 Maninagar
 Asarwa
 Vatva

Talukas in Ahmedabad City - West
 Vejalpur
 Sabarmati
 Ghatlodiya

Talukas in Ahmedabad Suburban
 Daskroi
 Sanand

Talukas in Rural North Ahmedabad
 Viramgam
 Detroj-Rampura
 Mandal

Talukas in Rural South Ahmedabad
 Bavla
 Dholka
 Dhandhuka
 Dholera

Villages

Politics
  

|}

Demographics

According to the 2011 census Ahmedabad district has a population of 7,214,225, roughly equal to Hong Kong or the U.S. state of Washington. This gives it a ranking of 8th in India (out of a total of 640). Its population growth rate over the decade 2001-2011 was 22.31%. Ahmedabad has a sex ratio of 903 females for every 1000 males, and a literacy rate of 86.65%.

The divided district has a population of 7,045,313, of which 6,028,152 (85.56%) lived in urban areas. Ahmedabad had a sex ratio of 904 females per 1000 males. Scheduled Castes and Scheduled Tribes make up 747,806 (10.61%) and 88,911 (1.26%) of the population respectively.

Cities and Towns 
The population of all cities and towns in the Ahmedabad district by census years.

Religion 

Hindus are 5,885,869 while Muslims are 871,887, Jains are 208,575 and Christians 50,631.

Language

At the time of the 2011 census, 74.21% of the population spoke Gujarati, 16.01% Hindi, 2.78% Urdu, 1.80% Sindhi, 1.64% Marathi and 1.55% Marwari as their first language.

Notable people
Acharya Hemachandra (1089–1172) Jain polymath. Born in Dhandhuka.
Joravarsinh Jadav (born 1940), folklorist

Notes

References

External links
 Official site
 Ahmedabad RTO

 
Districts of Gujarat